The molecular formula C8H10N4O2 may refer to:
 Enprofylline, a xanthine derivative used in the treatment of asthma.
 Caffeine, the world's most widely consumed psychoactive drug, present in coffee, chocolate, black and green tea, energy drinks, and more.